Gladiator is a 1992 American sports drama film directed by Rowdy Herrington, and starring Cuba Gooding Jr., James Marshall, Brian Dennehy, and Robert Loggia. The film tells the story of two teenagers trapped in the world of illegal underground boxing. One is fighting to pay off gambling debts accumulated by his father. The second is fighting for the money to get out of the ghetto. While being exploited by a boxing promoter, the two teens become friends.

Plot
Tommy Riley and his father have just moved to start a new life. Tommy's father has accumulated many gambling debts but has found a new job that requires him to travel extensively, leaving his son alone at home. Tommy also has a hard time fitting in at school, having crossed gang members. He takes a job at a local diner and enters into a romantic relationship with Dawn, the daughter of the owner, but is jumped by the gang members outside the restaurant. Seeing how well Tommy is able to fight, a local boxing promoter by the name of Pappy Jack offers Tommy a chance to fight in an illegal underground boxing operation. When two men arrive announcing that Tommy's father owes a large sum of money to pay off gambling debts, Jack convinces his boss, boxing promoter Jimmy Horn to buy out the debt, which forces Tommy to pay off his father's debts by boxing.

Tommy enjoys a great deal of success and develops a friendship with Romano and Abraham "Lincoln" Haines, two fellow fighters. However, he continues to be harassed by gang members, and discovers that two of them, "Black Death" and "Short Cut" are boxers who fight dirty, using elbows, kicks, knees, and low blows, and counting on the crooked refs to overlook the clear violations.  Tommy defeats Black Death in the ring, but Short Cut hides a fluid in his gloves, which he uses to blind Romano during a match.  Unable to defend himself, Romano is brutally beaten in the ring and is declared brain dead by the doctors.  Short Cut later tries the same trick on Tommy, but Tommy has learned to fight dirty, and defeats Short Cut.

Meanwhile, Lincoln shows signs of possible brain damage and is told to quit fighting for at least 60 days or else suffer permanent brain damage.  Despite this, Horn arranges a match between Lincoln and Tommy.  Afraid of killing Lincoln, Tommy takes a beating until the two are unwilling to continue the match.  In revenge, Horn, a former boxer who retired with only one defeat, punches Lincoln severely enough to knock him out of the ring.

Furious, Tommy challenges Horn to a match.  If Horn wins, Tommy will continue to work for him indefinitely, but if Tommy wins, his father's debt is wiped clean.  Horn accepts on the condition that they fight bare-knuckle. Horn's vast experience with boxing initially gives him the upper hand, and Horn's confidence influences him to play with and humiliate Tommy as a result. Tommy eventually uses the various forms of advice he has received throughout his brief boxing experience to outthink Horn: he fakes a broken hand to give Horn even more confidence, and then uses the element of surprise to defeat Horn, freeing himself from Horn's contract.

Cast
 James Marshall as Tommy "The Bridgeport Bomber" Riley
 Cuba Gooding Jr. as Abraham Lincoln Haines
 Brian Dennehy as Jimmy Horn
 Robert Loggia as Jack "Pappy Jack"
 Ossie Davis as Noah
 Cara Buono as Dawn
 Jon Seda as Romano Essadro
 Thomas Charles Simmons as Leo
 Debra Stipe as Charlene
 Jena Wynn as Laura Lee
 Lance Slaughter as "Shortcut"
 T.E. Russell as Leroy "Spits"
 Vonte Sweet as "Tidbits"
 Antoine Roshell as "Scarface"
 Jeon-Paul Griffin as "Black Death"
 John Heard as John Riley
 Francesca P. Roberts as Miss Higgins
 Emily Marie Hooper as Belinda
 Laura Whyte as Millie
 Cie Allman as Alexa, Ring Card Girl (uncredited)
 Tak Fujimoto as Spectator (uncredited)
 Benny "The Jet" Urquidez as Spectator (uncredited)
 Jesus Rivera as Spectator (uncredited)
 Al Hoffman as Body Double For Mr. Brian Dennehy (uncredited)

Production
Jon Seda made his debut on the film, auditioning for John G. Avildsen who was the original director. He was later called back for a screen test by Rowdy Herrington and was ultimately cast. He enjoyed working with Herrington, calling him a passionate director.

Reception
The film received a lukewarm reception from critics. On film aggregation website Rotten Tomatoes, Gladiator received a 31% rating, with an average score of 4.4/10, based on 13 reviews.

Soundtrack

A soundtrack containing a blend of hip hop and rock music was released on February 25, 1992 by Columbia Records It failed to make it to the Billboard charts, but Warrant's cover of "We Will Rock You" was a minor hit on the Billboard Hot 100, peaking at #83. The soundtrack also contained the last appearance by the rap group, 3rd Bass. Jerry Goldsmith's unused score was released by Intrada Records in 2013, but none of Brad Fiedel's retained score appears on the 1992 album.

References

External links

1992 films
1992 drama films
1990s English-language films
1990s sports drama films
1990s teen drama films
American boxing films
American sports drama films
American teen drama films
Columbia Pictures films
Films directed by Rowdy Herrington
Films scored by Brad Fiedel
Films set in Chicago
Films shot in Chicago
Films with screenplays by Robert Mark Kamen
Underground fighting films
1990s American films